Nicolas Brusque (born 7 August 1976 in Pau, Pyrénées-Atlantiques) is a French former rugby union footballer.  He has played for the French national team, including being a part of their 2003 Rugby World Cup squad. He usually played at fullback.

He made his international debut for France in a match against Romania in Lourdes in 1997. France won the match 39 points to 3. After playing in the 2002 Six Nations Championship he was then included in France's squad for the 2003 Rugby World Cup. He scored a try in the 51-9 pool win against Scotland.

External links
 Nicolas Brusque on sporting-heroes.net
 Nicolas Brusque on rwc2003.irb.com

1976 births
Living people
Sportspeople from Pau, Pyrénées-Atlantiques
French rugby union players
Rugby union fullbacks
Biarritz Olympique players
France international rugby union players